Morejón is a surname. Notable people with the surname include:

Adrian Morejón (born 1999), Cuban baseball player
Danny Morejón (1930–2009), Cuban-born American baseball player
Dariel Morejón (born 1998), Cuban football player
Frank Morejón (born 1986), Cuban baseball player
Genovevo Morejón (born 1954), Cuban track and field athlete
Glenda Morejón (born 2000), Ecuadorian racewalker
Luis Morejón (born 1973), Ecuadorian tennis player 
Nancy Morejón (born 1944), Cuban poet, critic, and essayist
Oswaldo Morejón (born 1959), Bolivian racewalker